Belliella aquatica  is a Gram-negative, strictly heterotrophic, aerobic, non-spore-forming and non-motile bacterium from the genus of Belliella which has been isolated from the saline lake Lake Tuosu from the Qaidam Basin in China.

References 

Cytophagia
Bacteria described in 2015